West of Cheyenne is a 1938 American Western film directed by Sam Nelson and starring Charles Starrett, Iris Meredith and Bob Nolan.

Main cast
 Charles Starrett as Brad Buckner 
 Iris Meredith as Jean Wayne 
 Bob Nolan as Foreman Bob Nolan 
 Pat Brady as Cowhand Pat 
 Dick Curtis as Link Murdock 
 Edward LeSaint as J.B. Wayne 
 Edmund Cobb as Henchman Dirkin 
 Art Mix as Henchman Cinch 
 Ernie Adams as Henchman Shorty 
 Jack Rockwell as Sheriff 
 John Tyrrell as Bartender Trigger 
 Sons of the Pioneers as Cowhands / Musicians

References

Bibliography
 Pitts, Michael R. Western Movies: A Guide to 5,105 Feature Films. McFarland, 2012.

External links
 

1938 films
1938 Western (genre) films
American black-and-white films
American Western (genre) films
Films directed by Sam Nelson
Columbia Pictures films
1930s English-language films
1930s American films